The Montenegro men's national water polo team represents Montenegro in international men's water polo competitions, and is controlled by the Water Polo and Swimming Federation of Montenegro.

Prior history
Between 1918 and 1991, Montenegro was part of Yugoslavia, and its players participated in the Yugoslavia national water polo team. Between 1992 and 2006, it was part of FR Yugoslavia, later Serbia and Montenegro, so Montenegrin players played for those teams; Serbia is the sole successor to these countries so those results are recorded at Serbia national water polo team.

Results

Olympic Games

World Championship

FINA World Cup

FINA World League

European Championship

Mediterranean Games

Team

Current squad
Roster for the 2020 Summer Olympics.

Coaches

 2006–2011 Petar Porobić
 2011–2015 Ranko Perović
 2015–present Vladimir Gojković

Notable players

Aleksandar Ivovic
Trifun Miro Ćirković
Dejan Dabović
Đuro Radović
Igor Gočanin
Vladimir Gojković
Zoran Gopčević
Nikola Janović
Milorad Krivokapić
Zoran Mustur
Đorđe Perišić
Ranko Perović
Andrija Popović
Božidar Stanišić - Cikota
Milan Tičić
Veljko Uskoković
Mirko Vičević
Željko Vičević
Nenad Vukanić
Boris Zloković
Stanko Zloković

See also
 Montenegro men's Olympic water polo team records and statistics
 Serbia and Montenegro men's national water polo team
 Yugoslavia men's national water polo team

Notes

References

External links

 

 
Men's national water polo teams
Men's sport in Montenegro